Garavito is a surname. Notable people with the surname include:

Luis Garavito (born 1957), prolific Colombian serial killer and rapist
Fernando Garavito, Colombian journalist and lawyer
Julio Garavito Armero (1865–1920), Colombian astronomer
 Chief Garavito, pre-Columbian Costa Rican tribe leader